The Austin Arts BBS was developed by Bill Hood of the School of Screenprinting in 1983. The Bulletin Board System (BBS) supplied news to the arts and screenprinting community not only in Austin, Texas where it was based, but to the world. The small BBS was the first to market to an industry - screenprinting.

Austin Arts BBS was the first BBS to run on Macintosh computers. It was also the first BBS to produce audio for its visitors, broadcasting news about screenprinting and music in a pre-recorded method in what was the precursor to Internet Radio

Eventually, the station was moved to the Internet when broadcasting became more commonplace with services like Live365.

References

Bulletin board systems